Custer is a ghost town in Custer County, Idaho, United States. Established in 1877, it is at  (44.3874133, -114.6959118), at an elevation of 6,470 feet (1,972 m). It lies along Yankee Fork Road southwest of the city of Challis, within the Challis National Forest.

In 1981, the community was listed on the National Register of Historic Places as a historic district.

Most of Custer is now included in the Land of the Yankee Fork State Park, which also includes the nearby historic Yankee Fork gold dredge.

References

External links

Community profile
Land of the Yankee Fork State Park

Populated places established in 1877
Geography of Custer County, Idaho
Ghost towns in Idaho
Historic districts on the National Register of Historic Places in Idaho
Protected areas of Custer County, Idaho
National Register of Historic Places in Custer County, Idaho
Populated places on the National Register of Historic Places in Idaho
1877 establishments in Idaho Territory